The 2000 Rugby Canada Super League season was the third season for the RCSL.

Standings
Western Division
{| class="wikitable" style="text-align: center;"
|-
! width="250"|Team
! width="20"|Pld
! width="20"|W
! width="20"|D
! width="20"|L
! width="20"|F
! width="20"|A
! width="25"|+/-
! width="20"|BP
! width="20"|Pts
|-
|align=left| Fraser Valley Venom
|5||4||0||1||150||88||+62||1||17
|-
|align=left| Manitoba Buffalo
|5||4||0||1||123||103||+20||1||17
|-
|align=left| Vancouver Island Crimson Tide
|5||3||0||2||142||92||+50||2||14
|-
|align=left| Calgary Mavericks
|5||2||0||3||99||101||-2||2||10
|-
|align=left| Edmonton Gold
|5||2||0||3||109||135||-26||1||9
|-
|align=left| Saskatchewan Prairie Fire
|5||0||0||5||92||181||-89||2||2
|}

Eastern Division
{| class="wikitable" style="text-align: center;"
|-
! width="250"|Team
! width="20"|Pld
! width="20"|W
! width="20"|D
! width="20"|L
! width="20"|F
! width="20"|A
! width="25"|+/-
! width="20"|BP
! width="20"|Pts
|-
|align=left| Nova Scotia Keltics
|5||5||0||0||135||74||+61||0||20
|-
|align=left| Toronto Renegades
|5||4||0||1||200||64||+136||1||17
|-
|align=left| Montreal Menace
|5||3||0||2||136||106||+30||0||12
|-
|align=left| Newfoundland Rock
|5||2||0||3||109||106||+3||1||9
|-
|align=left| New Brunswick Black Spruce
|5||1||0||4||101||205||-104||1||5
|-
|align=left| Eastern Ontario Harlequins
|5||0||0||5||74||223||-149||1||1
|}

Note: A bonus point was awarded for a loss of 7 points or less

Championship final

The Fraser Valley Venom (Western Division champions) defeated the Nova Scotia Keltics (Eastern Division Champions) 15–9 in the Championship Final, played in Halifax, Nova Scotia on 22 July 2000.

References

Rugby Canada Super League seasons
RCSL Season
2000 in Canadian rugby union